Richard O'Connell may refer to:
 Richard O'Connell (politician) (1892–1964), Irish politician
 Dick O'Connell (Richard Henry O'Connell, 1914–2002), American businessperson
 Rick O'Connell, the central protagonist of The Mummy series
 Richard O'Connell (racehorse trainer) (1949–2004), American Thoroughbred racehorse trainer
 Richard J. O'Connell (1941–2015), American geophysicist
 Richard O'Connell (bishop), Bishop of Ardfert in 1649

See also
 Richard Connell (disambiguation)